Mark L. Winston is a Canadian biologist and writer. A professor of apiculture and social insects at Simon Fraser University, he spent much of his career studying bees until becoming founding director of the university's Centre for Dialogue in 2006.

His 2014 book Bee Time: Lessons from the Hive won the Governor General's Award for English-language non-fiction and was shortlisted for the Science in Society General Book Award.

Works
The Biology of the Honey Bee (Harvard University Press, 1984)
Killer Bees: The Africanized Honey Bee in the Americas (Harvard University Press, 1992)
Nature Wars: People vs. Pests (Harvard University Press, 1997)
Travels in the Genetically Modified Zone (Harvard University Press, 2002)
Bee Time: Lessons from the Hive (Harvard University Press, 2014)

References

External links

Canadian biologists
Canadian science writers
Academic staff of Simon Fraser University
Writers from British Columbia
Living people
Governor General's Award-winning non-fiction writers
Year of birth missing (living people)